Joseph Wayne Miller (Park Ridge, Illinois, December 18, 1981 - Chicago, January 9, 2018) was an American actor, known for his appearance in the film Heavyweights where he played Salami Sam. He died in his sleep on January 9, 2018.  He was 36 when he died and his mother said he had sleep apnea.

Filmography
Folks! (1992) – Jerry, Jon's nephew
Heavyweights (1995) – Salami Sam

References

2018 deaths
American male film actors
People from Park Ridge, Illinois
Year of birth missing
1981 births